The Hibbert Journal was a large, quarterly magazine in softback book format, issued since 1902 by the Hibbert Trust, best described by its subtitle: A Quarterly Review of Religion, Theology and Philosophy. In the early years it was published by Williams and Norgate, 14 Henrietta Street, London, with the U.S. Agent being Sherman, French & Co,. 6 Beacon Street, Boston, Mass. The subscription c. 1911 was "Ten Shillings per annum, post free." It ceased publication in 1968.

Editorial Board and Key Persons associated with the Journal 
In its early years, The Hibbert Journal was edited by L. P. Jacks. A number of eminent people contributed to the production of the Journal; Knights and Lords, professors, philosophers, senior clergy and academics:
Professor William James
Sir Oliver Lodge
C.W Stubbs, Bishop of Truro
Sir Edward Russell of Liverpool

Notes

External links
Volumes 1-12 of The Hibbert Journal (electronic scans of first 36 issues)

1902 establishments in the United Kingdom
1968 disestablishments in the United Kingdom
Quarterly magazines published in the United Kingdom
Religious magazines published in the United Kingdom
Defunct magazines published in the United Kingdom
Magazines established in 1902
Magazines disestablished in 1968